Lobiopa insularis is a species of sap-feeding beetle in the family Nitidulidae. It is found in the Caribbean Sea, Central America, North America, and South America.

References

Further reading

 
 

Nitidulidae
Articles created by Qbugbot
Beetles described in 1840